Craig M. Johnson (born April 21, 1971) is an American politician and former Democratic Party member of the New York State Senate for the 7th district.

Education and early career
Johnson earned a B.A. degree (magna cum laude) from Amherst College in 1993. He earned his Juris Doctor degree (cum laude) from St. John's University School of Law in 1996. He was admitted to the New York bar in 1997. Johnson has practiced law at the law firm of Jaspan Schlesinger Hoffman LLP in Garden City, New York.

Political career
Johnson was first elected to the Nassau County Legislature in May 2000, succeeding his mother Barbara Johnson who died in March 2000.

On February 6, 2007, he became the first male Democrat elected to the State Senate from North Hempstead in more than a century. He represented the 7th Senatorial District, which includes all of North Hempstead and parts of Hempstead and Oyster Bay. He chaired the Senate Investigations and Government Operations Committee.

In the November 2, 2010 general election, Mineola Mayor Jack Martins, Johnson's Republican challenger (who was also backed by the Independence and Conservative Parties), defeated Johnson by 451 votes. On December 20, 2010, New York's highest court rejected Johnson's final appeal in regard to the election results.

Personal life
Johnson lives in Port Washington, New York with his wife Elizabeth and three children.

Election results
 February 2007 special election, NYS Senate, 7th SD
{| class="Wikitable"
| Craig M. Johnson (DEM - WOR) || ... || 27,632
|-
| Maureen C. O’Connell (REP - IND - CON) || ... || 23,995
|}

 November 2008 general election, NYS Senate, 7th SD
{| class="Wikitable"
| Craig M. Johnson (DEM) || ... || 68,172
|-
| Barbara C. Donno (REP - IND - CON) || ... || 52,124
|}

 November 2010 general election, NYS Senate, 7th SD
{| class="Wikitable"
| Jack M. Martins (REP - IND - CON) || ... || 42,928
|-
| Craig M. Johnson (DEM) || ... || 42,477
|}

See also
 2009 New York State Senate leadership crisis
Paterson, David "Black, Blind, & In Charge: A Story of Visionary Leadership and Overcoming Adversity."Skyhorse Publishing. New York, New York, 2020

References

External links
 Former New York State Senate website

1971 births
Living people
Democratic Party New York (state) state senators
Politicians from New York City
People from Port Washington, New York
Amherst College alumni
St. John's University School of Law alumni
21st-century American politicians